Pseudovadonia is a genus of beetles belonging to the family Cerambycidae, subfamily Lepturinae.

Species
Pseudovadonia is monotypic and includes only the following species:

 Pseudovadonia livida (Fabricius, 1776)

References 

Lepturinae